Jutanugarn is a surname. Notable people with the surname include:

Ariya Jutanugarn (born 1995), Thai professional golfer
Moriya Jutanugarn (born 1994), Thai professional golfer, sister of above

Thai-language surnames